DisCoCat (Categorical Compositional Distributional) is a mathematical framework for natural language processing which uses category theory to unify distributional semantics with the principle of compositionality. The grammatical derivations in a categorial grammar (usually a pregroup grammar) are interpreted as linear maps acting on the tensor product of word vectors to produce the meaning of a sentence or a piece of text. String diagrams are used to visualise information flow and reason about natural language semantics.

History 
The framework was first introduced by Bob Coecke, Mehrnoosh Sadrzadeh, and Stephen Clark as an application of categorical quantum mechanics to natural language processing. It started with the observation that pregroup grammars and quantum processes shared a common mathematical structure: they both form a rigid category (also known as a non-symmetric compact closed category). As such, they both benefit from a graphical calculus, which allows a purely diagrammatic reasoning. Although the analogy with quantum mechanics was kept informal at first, it eventually led to the development of quantum natural language processing.

Definition 
There are multiple definitions of DisCoCat in the literature, depending on the choice made for the compositional aspect of the model. The common denominator between all the existent versions, however, always involves a categorical definition of DisCoCat as a structure-preserving functor from a category of grammar to a category of semantics, which usually encodes the distributional hypothesis.

The original paper used the categorical product of FinVect with a pregroup seen as a posetal category. Unfortunately this approach does not work, indeed all parallel arrows of a posetal category are equal, which means that pregroups cannot distinguish between different grammatical derivations for the same syntactically ambiguous sentence.

Instead, one needs to consider the free rigid category  generated by the pregroup grammar. That is,  has generating objects for the words and the basic types of the grammar, and generating arrows  for the dictionary entries which assign a pregroup type  to a word . The arrows  are grammatical derivations for the sentence  which can be represented as string diagrams with cups and caps, i.e. adjunction units and counits.

With this definition of pregroup grammars as free rigid categories, DisCoCat models can be defined as strong monoidal functors . Spelling things out in detail, they assign a finite dimensional vector space  to each basic type  and a vector  in the appropriate tensor product space to each dictionary entry  where  (objects for words are sent to the monoidal unit, i.e. ). The meaning of a sentence  is then given by a vector   which can be computed as the contraction of a tensor network.

The underlying idea of distributional hypothesis "A word is characterized by the company it keeps" is particularly relevant when assigning meaning to words like adjectives or verbs, whose semantic connotation is strongly dependent on context.

Variations 
Variations of DisCoCat have been proposed with a different choice for the grammar category. The main motivation behind this lies in the fact that pregroup grammars have been proved to be weakly equivalent to context-free grammars. One example of variation chooses Combinatory categorial grammar as the grammar category.

List of linguistic phenomena 
The DisCoCat framework has been used to study the following phenomena from linguistics.

 Entailment
 Coordination
 Hyponymy and hypernymy
 Ambiguity with density matrices
 Discourse analysis
 Anaphora and ellipsis
 Language evolution

Applications in NLP 
The DisCoCat framework has been applied to solve the following tasks in natural language processing.

 Word-sense disambiguation
 Semantic similarity
 Question answering
 Machine translation
 Anaphora resolution

See also 

 Lambek calculus
 Pregroup grammar
 Distributional semantics
 Principle of compositionality
 String diagram
 Categorical quantum mechanics
 Quantum natural language processing

External links 
 DisCoPy, a Python toolkit for computing with string diagrams
 lambeq, a Python library for quantum natural language processing

References 

Computational linguistics
Category theory